The Merseyside Professional Championship was a professional non-ranking snooker tournament held in England that ran from 1993 to 2004. The final champion was Joe Perry.

History
The tournament was a highly successful low-budget professional event promoted by referee Peter Williamson. Although the prize money was modest, it attracted a large field mainly drawn from the lower end of the ranking list.

Winners

References

Snooker non-ranking competitions
Recurring sporting events established in 1993
Recurring events disestablished in 2004
1993 establishments in England
2004 disestablishments in England
Snooker competitions in England
Defunct snooker competitions
Defunct sports competitions in England